Oleg Leonidovich Yeprintsev (born March 19 1962) is a retired Russian footballer and current manager of PS Kemi.

External links
 

1962 births
People from Ingushetia
Living people
Soviet footballers
Soviet expatriate footballers
Russian footballers
Russian expatriate footballers
Expatriate footballers in Finland
FC Saturn Ramenskoye players
Myllykosken Pallo −47 players
Association football midfielders
TP-47 players
Soviet expatriate sportspeople in Finland
Russian football managers
TP-47 managers
Kemi City F.C. managers